Andrew Nethsingha, FRCO, ARCM (born 16 May 1968) is an English choral conductor and organist, the son of the late Lucian Nethsingha, also a cathedral organist. He was appointed Organist and Master of the Choristers at Westminster Abbey in London in 2023, having previous held similar positions at St John's College, Cambridge, Gloucester Cathedral and Truro Cathedral.

Education
Nethsingha's early musical training was at Exeter Cathedral School as a chorister of the cathedral, where his father, Lucian Nethsingha, was Organist and Choirmaster for over a quarter of a century. He was a music scholar at Clifton College in Bristol, where he studied with Gwilym Isaacs before gaining an organ scholarship to St John's College, Cambridge. He later studied at the Royal College of Music, where he won seven prizes, and at St John's College. He held organ scholarships under Christopher Robinson at St George's Chapel, Windsor Castle, and under George Guest, both of whom were Organists and Directors of Music at St John's College.

Career

Cathedral positions
After serving as assistant organist at Wells Cathedral for four years, Nethsingha was appointed Master of the Choristers and Organist at Truro Cathedral in 1994, becoming the youngest cathedral organist in the country. During his eight years there, the reputation of the choir increased considerably. In 2002 he succeeded David Briggs (whom he had also followed at Truro) at Gloucester Cathedral and held the artistic directorship of the Three Choirs Festival in Gloucester and the conductorship of Gloucester Choral Society.

As Director of Music at St John's College, Cambridge from 2007 to 2022, he helped to set up the recording label "St John's Cambridge" in conjunction with Signum Records. The first release on this label, DEO (with music by Jonathan Harvey), won an award from BBC Music Magazine in 2017. Six recent albums have been editor’s choices in Gramophone Magazine. At St Johns, Nethsingha initiated the annual Advent Commission series in 2008 with the support of an anonymous Johnian benefactor, with some of the most recent works composed by Helen Grime, Cheryl Frances-Hoad and Judith Bingham. In October 2021 Nethsingha led the move to admit female singers to the Choir, to start in 2022.

In July 2022 it was announced that Nethsingha would succeed James O'Donnell as Organist and Master of the Choristers of Westminster Abbey. He took up his new role at Westminster in January 2023.

Other work
As an orchestral conductor, Nethsingha has led the Philharmonia Orchestra in works that include Mahler’s 8th Symphony, Beethoven’s 9th Symphony, Britten’s War Requiem, Brahms’ Requiem, Elgar’s The Dream of Gerontius and The Kingdom, Walton’s Belshazzar’s Feast, Poulenc’s Gloria and Duruflé’s Requiem. He has also worked with the Royal Philharmonic Orchestra, the City of Birmingham Symphony Orchestra, the London Mozart Players, the Britten Sinfonia, the Orchestra of St. Luke's in New York, the Aarhus Symphony Orchestra and the BBC Concert Orchestra. Venues have included the BBC Proms, the Concertgebouw in Amsterdam, the Verbier Festival, Suntory Hall in Tokyo, the Konzerthaus Berlin and the Singapore Esplanade.

Personal life
Nethsingha is married to Lucy Nethsingha, a Liberal Democrat politician who is currently Leader of Cambridgeshire County Council after previously serving as a Member of the European Parliament (MEP) from 2019 to 2020, They married in 1996 and have three children.

Recordings

 The Tree: a live album celebrating the heritage of the choir. The album plays with the idea of growth, inspired by the tree in the Book of Job. St John’s Cambridge label with Signum Records, November 2021
 Magnificat 2: a second album of settings of the Evening Canticles. St John’s Cambridge label with Signum Records, April 2021. Gramophone Editor’s Choice, June 2021
 Advent Live - Volume 2: a second collection of live performances from Advent Carol Services at St John's College. St John’s Cambridge label with Signum Records, November 2020
 Pious Anthems and Voluntaries: a recording of the nine-part cycle by Michael Finnissy written whilst Composer in Residence at St John’s College. St John's Cambridge label with Signum Records, 2020. Gramophone Editor’s Choice, September 2020 & Gramophone Awards Finalist (Contemporary), 2021. BBC Music Magazine Choral and Song Choice, October 2020. The music was choral nominee at the 2020 Ivors Composer Awards
 Magnificat: an album dedicated to settings of the Evening Canticles. St John’s Cambridge label with Signum Records, 2019. Gramophone Editor’s Choice, Awards Issue 2019
 Locus Iste, a collection that takes music from each decade of the 150 year history of the College Chapel. St John’s Cambridge label with Signum Records, 2019. Gramophone Editor’s Choice, July 2019
 Advent Live - Volume 1: a selection of live performances from Advent Carol Services at St John's College. St John’s Cambridge label with Signum Records, October 2018
Mass in G minor: the music of Ralph Vaughan Williams. Joseph Wicks (organ), David Blackadder (trumpet). St John's Cambridge label with Signum Records, 2018. BBC Music Magazine Choral and Song Choice, July 2018
 Kyrie: works by Francis Poulenc, Zoltán Kodály and Leoš Janáček. Joseph Wicks and Glen Dempsey (organ), Anne Denholm (harp). St John's Cambridge label with Signum Records, September 2017
 Christmas with St John's. Joseph Wicks (organ). St John's Cambridge label with Signum Records, October 2016
 Deo: music by Jonathan Harvey. Edward Picton-Turbervill (organ). St John's Cambridge label with Signum Records, May 2016. BBC Music Magazine Award Winner (Choral) 2017

References

External links
Director of Music
Director of Music | StJohns

Living people
1968 births
English classical organists
British male organists
English conductors (music)
British male conductors (music)
British people of Sri Lankan descent
Alumni of St John's College, Cambridge
Fellows of St John's College, Cambridge
Fellows of the Royal College of Organists
21st-century British conductors (music)
21st-century organists
21st-century British male musicians
People educated at Exeter Cathedral School
Male classical organists